Jean-François Antonioli (b. Lausanne, February 25, 1959) is a Swiss pianist, conductor and piano pedagogue.

Studied piano at Conservatoire de Lausanne and Conservatoire de Paris (with Pierre Sancan). Further studies include those with Bruno Seidlhofer in Vienna  and Carlo Zecchi in Rome.

Performed solo or with orchestra in many musical centres in Europe, North America and Asia. He took part at international music festivals as Montreux-Vevey, Lucerne, Bad Ragaz, Radio-France in Montpellier, Jeunesse Festival at the Vienna Konzerthaus, The Merano Festival in Italy, Dubrovnik Summer Festival, Pecs Napok in Hungary, Enescu and Lipatti in Bucharest, Lanaudičre in Montréal, Québec Festival d'Eté, Birmingham Festival of Arts, Wolf Trap in Washington and others.

He has recorded more than 20 CDs. His most famous recording are those of Debussy's 24 Preludes, works of Ferruccio Busoni, Joachim Raff and Arthur Honegger. For the recording of Frank Martin's works for piano and orchestra he was awarded by the French "Grand Prix International du Disque de l'Académie Charles Cros" in Paris in 1986.

From 1993 to 2002 he held a position of a Principal Guest Conductor of the Timișoara Philharmonic Orchestra in Romania with which he toured many European countries. He specialized in performance of complete Mozart Piano Concertos, combining conducting and playing the solo part at the same time.

His orchestral recordings are highly appreciated, awarded and praised by critics worldwide. They include Concertos by Mozart, works of Jean Perrin, Carl Maria von Weber, Ferruccio Busoni, Arthur Honegger and Jean Cras.

Both as pianist and conductor, he premiered many important works of contemporary composers.

He has been juror at several major international piano competitions and regularly teaches masterclasses for young pianists.

He is a full-time professor at the Conservatoire de Lausanne – Haute Ecole de Musique where he holds position of the Head of the Piano department.

External links 
 Official website
 Antonioli's biography at Classics Abroad
 (in French) Conservatoire de Lausanne
 Genealogy on Pianists Corner
 Playlist on Pianists Corner

1959 births
Living people
Swiss pianists
Swiss male musicians
Conservatoire de Paris alumni
Academic staff of the École Normale de Musique de Paris
Lausanne Conservatory alumni
People from Lausanne
21st-century pianists
21st-century male musicians